Marinobacter salicampi is a Gram-negative, rod-shaped and motile bacterium from the genus of Marinobacter which has been isolated from the Yellow Sea in Korea.

References

External links
Type strain of Marinobacter salicampi at BacDive -  the Bacterial Diversity Metadatabase

Further reading 
 

Alteromonadales
Bacteria described in 2007